5-Bromo-4-chloro-3-indolyl phosphate (BCIP, X-phosphate, XP) is an artificial chromogenic substrate used for the sensitive colorimetric detection of alkaline phosphatase activity. It is, for example, used in immunoblotting, in situ hybridization, and immunohistochemistry, often in combination with nitro blue tetrazolium chloride (NBT). 5-bromo-4-chloro-3-indoxyl is oxidized by atmospheric oxygen to form the blue dye 5,5′-dibromo-4,4′-dichloro-indigo. It is also oxidized by nitroblue tetrazolium (NBT), which forms an insoluble dark blue diformazan precipitate after reduction. Alkaline phosphatase is commonly conjugated to secondary antibodies.

References

Indoles
Organophosphates
Chloroarenes
Bromoarenes